This is a list of the main career statistics of Agnieszka Radwańska, a former professional tennis player from Poland. Radwańska won 20 Women's Tennis Association (WTA) singles titles, including one year-end championship at the 2015 WTA Finals, three WTA Premier Mandatory singles titles, and two WTA Premier 5 titles. Along with that, she won two titles in doubles, including one major - at the 2011 Miami Open. On the International Tennis Federation (ITF) Women's Circuit, she has four titles (per two in both events). On the WTA Rankings, Radwańska achieved a career high singles ranking of world no. 2 on July 9, 2012, right after reaching final of the Wimbledon Championships.

Despite not winning any Grand Slam, she had impressive performances. In singles, she reached one final at the 2012 Wimbledon Championships. Along with that, she has six semifinals appearances (four in singles and two in doubles) and nine quarterfinals (seven in singles and two in doubles). She reached at least semifinal at all four Grand Slams in either events. At the Premier Mandatory & 5 tournaments she went one step further. In 2011, she won back-to-back Pan Pacific and China Open. The following year, she won the Miami Open. Later, in 2014 she won the Canadian Open and then in 2016 another title at the China Open.

Radwańska also set some records for the country (Poland). In August 2007, she became the first player representing Poland to win a WTA singles title. At the end of 2008, she finished the year ranked world no. 10, becoming the first Polish player to achieve that. She also became the first Polish player to surpass $1 million in earnings.  During the 2014, she cracked the top 3 of the WTA rankings for the first time in her career. Reaching final of the 2012 Wimbledon Championships, shereached her first  became the first player representing Poland to reach the final of a Grand Slam singles event in the Open Era.

Performance timelines 
Only main-draw results in WTA Tour, Grand Slam tournaments, Fed Cup and Olympic Games are included in win–loss records.

Singles

Doubles

Grand Slam tournament finals

Singles: 1 (1 runner-up)

Other significant finals

WTA Finals finals

Singles: 1 (title)

WTA Premier Mandatory & Premier 5 finals

Singles: 8 (5 titles, 3 runners-up)

Doubles: 2 (1 title, 1 runner-up)

WTA career finals

Singles: 28 (20 titles, 8 runners-up)

Doubles: 4 (2 titles, 2 runners-up)

Team competition: 2 (1 title, 1 runner-up)

ITF Circuit finals 
Since Radwańska professional debut in April 2005 she won 2 ITF Titles in singles performance and she was 3 times runners up. She also reached 5 ITF doubles finals and she won 2 of them.

Singles: 5 (2 titles, 3 runner-ups)

Doubles: 5 (2 titles, 3 runner-ups)

ITF junior results

Singles: 10 (7 titles, 3 runner-ups)

Doubles: 12 (11 titles, 1 runner-up)

WTA Tour career earnings 
Radwańska earned more than 27 million dollars during her career.

Career Grand Slam statistics

Grand Slam tournament seedings

Best Grand Slam tournament results details

Record against top 10 players 

Radwańska's match record against players who have been ranked in the top 10 (as of 29 October 2022). Active players are in boldface:

Top 10 wins

Double bagel matches (6–0, 6–0)

Fed Cup participation 
This Table is current through the 2014 Fed Cup

Singles: 43 (34–9)

Doubles: 10 (8–2)

Notes

References

External links 
 
 
 

Radwanska, Agnieszka